"Dream Weaver" is the fourteenth episode of seaQuest DSV`s second season. It originally aired on February 19, 1995.

Quick Overview: When a comet splashes into the water near seaQuest`s location, it mysteriously disintegrates into particles, which cocoons the boat and impregnates it with an aggressive alien predator that attacks the crew.

Plot
While recovering a comet that has apparently traversed the known universe inside of six weeks that has splashed down near seaQuest`s location, the stellar fragment turns out to be the hatchery of an alien "Stormer" that evolves aboard the boat, disables the submarine, and attacks the crew. When Captain Bridger orders the crew to report to emergency shelters, Ortiz turns up missing, leading Commander Ford, Lieutenant Brody, and visiting Commander Scott Keller on a search throughout the ship to find him and the alien.

Meanwhile, with the ship's systems off-line, Henderson attempts to repair the communications vidlink and call for help, but, she is captured by the alien in the process. Masquerading as the young lieutenant, the alien is able to steal a seaLaunch and use it to locate Professor Tobias LeConte at his university. With the blind professor in his clutches, the alien attempts to kill him, but LeConte is able to fend him off. Revealing to Keller, Ford, and Brody that he is, himself, an alien as well, he tells him that the Stormer has come from their homeworld, Hyperion, to bring LeConte back for execution, his teachings of non-expansion and harmony branding him a traitor. However, LeConte is able to kill the Stormer first.

Knowing that more will come in search of him, LeConte realizes he has no choice but to leave Earth, inviting Keller to come along with him in search of new worlds.

Background
This episode is part one in a three part trilogy that continues in the season finale, "Splashdown" and is finally resolved in the third season premiere, "Brave New World."

Rosalind Allen (Dr. Wendy Smith) does not appear in this episode, making it her first of two non-appearances during the season.

Guest starring in this episode is Mark Hamill, no stranger to the science fiction genre, having famously portrayed Luke Skywalker in A New Hope, The Empire Strikes Back, and Return of the Jedi. This episode also features Kent McCord's fourth appearance in the series.

Oscar L. Costo makes his directorial debut in this episode, having previously served as production manager on the series. He would go on to direct several other episodes of the series. The crew of seaQuest DSV received commemorative T-shirts of this episode from Costo.

After beginning the season with a beard, Roy Scheider (Captain Bridger) appears in this episode clean-shaven, as he did during the first season. He would retain this look for the remainder of his stint on the series.

This episode (as well as the following one) originally aired before the episode titled "Watergate" due to a preemption by NBC the week prior.

References

External links
 "SeaQuest DSV" Dream Weaver at the Internet Movie Database

SeaQuest DSV episodes
1995 American television episodes